Saint-Gaudens is a commune and a sub-prefecture of the Haute-Garonne department in southwestern France.

It faces the Pyrenees and is a natural crossroads for routes between the Atlantic and the Mediterranean and between Toulouse and the Val d'Aran in Catalonia. Saint-Gaudens station has rail connections to Toulouse, Bayonne, Pau and Tarbes.

History
Saint-Gaudens has been inhabited since ancient times (traces of the Iron Age and of Roman occupation) and was originally called Mas-Saint-Pierre, before taking the name of the young shepherd, Gaudens, martyred by the Visigoths at the end of the 5th century for refusing to renounce his faith.

The town later developed around the 11th century Romanesque church.  It was granted its city charter in 1202 and became the capital of the Nébouzan area, protected by solid ramparts.  As an important regional marketplace, Saint-Gaudens became the economic capital of the Comminges.

The town was damaged by Protestant forces under Montgomery in 1569, and became the seat of the Nébouzan Assembly after coming under the control of the French crown in 1607.  The name was changed briefly to "Mont-Unité" during the Revolution and the area later became part of the Haute-Garonne départment.

Population

Sights

The Collegiate Church of St. Peter and St. Gaudens, with its cloister and chapter house, this was one of the most important religious buildings in the Comminges.
It was home to a college of canons ordinary, a community founded by Bishop Bertrand.
The 11th century romanesque church, built on the typical Pyrenean plan as a basilica with a nave and two aisles, stands on the site of an earlier construction.
It was extended in the 12th and 13th centuries with the construction of the cloister and chapter house.  The lateral north door was added in the 16th century.

Several tall buildings are reminders of the city's medieval period, with plain façades to which balconies were added at the end of the 19th century.  Other buildings, including some town houses, date back to the 18th century, and are decorated with stone carvings.  Some buildings have façades with pediments, friezes and cornices, mouldings, and gabled dormer windows.  On Boulevard Bepmale the façades that face the Sun, with a view of the Pyrenees, have balconies and galleries up to their very top floors.

Sport
St Gaudens has a Rugby League (Rugby XIII) team playing in the French Championship, the Saint-Gaudens Bears.

St Gaudens also hosts a popular rugby union team (Rugby XV) SSGL (Stade Saint-Gaudinois Luchonnais XV).

The Open International Féminin Midi-Pyrénées Saint-Gaudens Comminges, an ITF Women's Circuit tennis tournament, is held in Saint-Gaudens.

The 2014 Tour de France cycle race began stage 17 in Saint Gaudens, with a  route to Saint-Lary.

International relations
Saint-Gaudens is twinned with:
  Avranches, France
  Barbastro, Spain
  Vielha e Mijaran, Spain

Notable people
Christophe Avezac (born 1977), footballer 
Yves Giraud-Cabantous (1904–1973), racing driver
Maelle Millet (born 2004), rhythmic gymnast

See also
 Grand Prix du Comminges
 Sculptor Augustus St. Gaudens
 Communes of the Haute-Garonne department

References

External links

 Official website 
 Saint-Gaudens Tourist Office website 

Communes of Haute-Garonne
Subprefectures in France
Haute-Garonne communes articles needing translation from French Wikipedia